Darieium was an ancient city of Asia Minor. Stephanus of Byzantium mentions it as a city of Phrygia. He has also Dorieium, a city of Phrygia, which some suppose may be the same place. Pliny has also a Doron, or Dorio, as it is said to be written in some manuscripts, in Cilicia Tracheia, that may also be the same place.

References

Roman towns and cities in Turkey
Greek colonies in Anatolia
Lost ancient cities and towns
Populated places in Phrygia
Former populated places in Cilicia
Former populated places in Turkey